Asgharabad (also Romanized as Aşgharābād; also known as Askarābād) is a village in Razan Rural District, Zagheh District, Khorramabad County, Lorestan Province, Iran. At the 2006 census, its population was 23, in 6 families.

References 

Towns and villages in Khorramabad County